This article refers to the Sports broadcasting contracts in Latvia. For a list of other country's broadcasting rights, see Sports television broadcast contracts.

Fight Sports 
CAGE MMA Finland: Viaplay
Glory: TV3 Sport
Golden Boy: DAZN
King of Kings: TV3 Sport
KSW: Viaplay
Matchroom: DAZN
UFC: TV3 Sport

Football 
FIFA World Cup: LTV
UEFA Champions League: Viaplay
Premier League: Viaplay
La Liga: Setanta Sports Eurasia

Motor racing
Formula One: Viaplay

References

Latvia
Television in Latvia